Miihier Singh is a professional bodybuilder from India. He won Mr. India Men's body building competition in March 2014.

Early life
Miihier was born in a middle-class family in Mumbai. He was hooked to cricket and after receiving his preliminary education in Mumbai he relocated to England to work on his game. He has played for a first class cricket club and represented Surrey United Kingdom as a batsman. Post completion of his studies and specialized  course on fitness and nutrition, Miihier switched from being a cricketer to a fitness athlete. He entered bodybuilding in his early twenties and went on to win accolades for the country

Amateur career
Miihier represented India at the 47th Asian bodybuilding and sports championship where he stood 4th among 350 athletes.

In the media 
Miihier Singh was honored by Ram Nivas Goel, Speaker of Sixth Legislative Assembly of Delhi for his outstanding contribution to the health & fitness industry in January 2021.

Miihier Singh collaborated with Sergi Constance, a Spanish bodybuilder, model, and actor to launch a fitness clothing brand by the name BeLegend in the Indian markets. Miihier Singh is the co-owner of the brand along with his partner Hummingbird Hospitality and Healthcare owned by Darpan Shrivastava.

Awards
 Silver Medalist at the 5th World Bodybuilding & Physique Sports Championship.
 Gold Medalist Mr. India Men's Physique National Champion 2014.

References

External links
 Official website

Indian bodybuilders
1988 births
Living people
Sportspeople from Mumbai